Asterophoma is a genus of fungi in the family Mycocaliciaceae. This is a monotypic genus, containing the single species Asterophoma mazaediicola.

References

External links
Index Fungorum

Eurotiomycetes
Monotypic Ascomycota genera
Taxa named by David Leslie Hawksworth